Events from the year 1924 in art.

Events
 February – El Lissitzky enters a Swiss sanatorium, suffering from tuberculosis.
 March – Exhibition Alfred Stieglitz Presents Fifty-One Recent Pictures: Oils, Water-colors, Pastels, Drawings, by Georgia O'Keeffe (together with a display of his photographs) opens at the Anderson Galleries in New York City.
 May 15 – Juan Gris delivers his lecture Des possibilités de la peinture at the University of Paris.
 July 9 – American painters Edward Hopper and Josephine Nivison marry at the French evangelical church in New York City; Guy Pène du Bois attends.
 August –  English artist and designer Eric Gill moves with some of his artistic community from Ditchling in East Sussex to the disused Llanthony Abbey at Capel-y-ffin in Wales.
 September 24 – Première of the Dadaist post-Cubist Futurist experimental art film Ballet Mécanique conceived, written and co-directed by the painter Fernand Léger in collaboration with Dudley Murphy and Man Ray at the Internationale Ausstellung neuer Theatertechnik (International Exposition for New Theater Technique) in Vienna presented by Frederick Kiesler. It features Alice Prin ("Kiki de Montparnasse") and has a musical score by American composer George Antheil but is presented in a silent version on this occasion.
 December – The Bucharest International Modern Art Exhibit, an avant-garde event hosted by Contimporanul, displaying works by Constantin Brâncuși, Hans Arp, Paul Klee, János Mattis-Teutsch, Kurt Schwitters, Michel Seuphor, Miliţa Pătraşcu, Marcel Janco, Victor Brauner and M. H. Maxy.
 December 11 – Alfred Stieglitz and Georgia O'Keeffe marry.
 The Surrealist Manifesto is conceived.
 Sir Frank Brangwyn is commissioned to paint the British Empire Panels, intended for the Royal Gallery in the House of Lords in the Palace of Westminster, but eventually inaugurated in the Brangwyn Hall at the Guildhall, Swansea, in 1934.
 Vilmos Aba Novák's works are on display for the first time.
 Fernand Léger and Amédée Ozenfant open a common studio.
 Ben Nicholson begins to paint abstracts.

Awards
 Archibald Prize: William Beckwith McInnes – Portrait of Miss Collins
 Art competitions at the 1924 Summer Olympics – painting: Jean Jacoby
 Tagea Brandt Rejselegat: Anna Ancher

Works

Paintings
 Tarsila do Amaral – Estação de Ferro Central do Brasil
 George Bellows – Dempsey and Firpo
 Romaine Brooks – Una, Lady Troubridge
 Carlo Carrà – San Giacomo di Varallo
 Lovis Corinth – Big self-portrait on the Walchensee
 Otto Dix – Portrait of the Art Dealer Johanna Ey
 Edwin Holgate – Portrait of Albert Henry Stewart Gillson
 Edward Hopper – New York Pavements
 A. Y. Jackson – In Jasper Park
 David Jones – The Garden Enclosed
 Wassily Kandinsky – Contrasting Sounds
 Paul Klee – Asiatic God, Carnival in the Mountains, Flower Garden
 Fernand Léger – Elément Mécanique
 Joan Miró – Le Piège, Le Carnaval d'Arlequin, Head of a Catalan Peasant (sequence commenced)
 Emil Nolde – Madonna with Begonia
 William Orpen – Self Portrait, Multiple Mirrors
 Pascin – Portrait of Pierre Mac Orlan
 Samuel John Peploe – Roses in a White Vase with Fruit
 Diego Rivera – Day of the Dead and other frescos at the Ministry of Education building (Mexico City)
 Philippe Robert – Frescos at Biel/Bienne railway station
 Charles Sheeler – MacDougal Alley
 Mario Sironi – L'allieva
 Nicolae Tonitza – The Forester's Daughter
 Raymond Wintz – The Blue Door (Un coin du port a Doelan)

Photographs
 Man Ray – Le Violon d'Ingres

Sculptures

 Amory's Tribute to the Heroes of 1861–1865
Joaquín Bilbao – Ferdinand III of Castile (equestrian, Seville)
 Constantin Brâncuși
 Bird in Space (early version)
 The Cock
 Charles Keck – Liberty Monument (Ticonderoga, New York)
 Eric Kennington – 24th East Surrey Division War Memorial (Battersea Park, London)
 Augustus Lukeman – Francis Asbury (equestrian, Washington, D.C.)
 Paul Manship – Statue of Diana (Hudson River Museum, Yonkers)
 Andrew O'Connor – Lafayette Monument (Baltimore, Maryland)
 Albin Polasek – Theodore Thomas Memorial (Chicago)
 Alexander Phimister Proctor – Indian Maiden and Fawn (Eugene, Oregon)
 Gertrude Vanderbilt Whitney – Buffalo Bill – The Scout

Births
 28 January – George Papassavas, Greek-American painter
 29 January 
Marcelle Ferron, Canadian painter and stained glass artist (d.2001).
Peter Voulkos, American sculptor and academic (d.2002).
 6 February – John Richardson, English-born art historian (d. 2019).
 2 March – Co Westerik, Dutch visual artist (d. 2018)
 7 March – Eduardo Paolozzi, Scottish sculptor and artist (d. 2005).
 8 March – Anthony Caro, English sculptor (d.2013).
 13 March – Paul Brach, American abstract painter, lecturer and educator (d.2007).
 30 March – Robert Dickerson, Australian figurative painter (d. 2015).
 10 April – Kenneth Noland, American painter.
 14 April – Robert Stewart, Scottish textile designer (d.1995)
 20 June – Fritz Koenig, German sculptor.
 7 August – Georges Lévis, French comic artist (d.1988).
 8 August – Edouard Jaguer, French poet and art critic (d.2006).
 29 August – Jack Baer, British art dealer (d. 2016).
 4 September – Anita Snellman, Finnish painter (d. 2006)
 21 September – David Sylvester, English art critic and curator (d. 2001).
 22 September – Charles Keeping, English illustrator, children's book author and lithographer (d. 1988).
 19 November – Knut Steen, Norwegian sculptor (d.2011).
 26 November – George Segal, American painter and sculptor (d. 2000).
 7 December – Liisi Beckmann, Finnish artist and designer (d. 2004).
 17 December – Clifton Pugh, Australian artist (d. 1990).
 24 December – Nissim Ezekiel, Indian poet, playwright and art critic (d.2004).
 24 December – Michael Goldberg, American abstract expressionist painter and teacher (d.2007).
 date unknown
 Dorothy Bohm, German-born British photographer.
 Art Brenner, American painter and sculptor (d.2013).
 William H. Burns, Northern Irish artist (d.1995).
 Jamil Hamoudi, Iraqi painter (d.2003).
 Robert Ortlieb, American sculptor (d.2011)

Deaths
 February 1 – Maurice Prendergast, American painter (b. 1858)
 February 11 – Jean-François Raffaëlli, French realist painter, sculptor and printmaker (b. 1850)
 March 4 – Fanny Eaton, Jamaican-born artists' model (b. 1835)
 March 9 – Daniel Ridgway Knight, American painter (b. 1839)
 April 3 – Franz von Bayros, Austrian erotic artist and illustrator (b. 1866)
 April 5 – Victor David Brenner, American medalist, sculptor and engraver (b. 1871)
 April 18 – Frank X. Leyendecker, American illustrator (b. 1877)
 April 22 – Sir James Lawton Wingate, Scottish landscape painter (b. 1846)
 May 2 – Anna Palm de Rosa, Swedish-born painter (b. 1859)
 May 26 - F. W. Pomeroy, English sculptor (b. 1856)
 May 30 – Amélie Beaury-Saurel, French painter (b. 1849)
 June 14 – Emile Claus, Belgian painter (b. 1849)
 July 12 – Henrietta Ward, English painter (b. 1832)
 August 19 – Ferdinand Cheval, French naïve architect of the "Palais Idéal" (b. 1836)
 November 2 – Kai Nielsen, Danish sculptor (b. 1882)
 November 7 – Hans Thoma, German painter (b. 1839)
 December 21 – Francesco Negri, Italian photographer (b. 1841)
 December 23 – Christopher Whall, English stained-glass artist (b. 1849)
 December 28 – Léon Bakst, Russian painter and theatrical designer (b. 1866)
 December 31 – Tomioka Tessai, Japanese painter and calligrapher in Meiji period (b. 1837)

See also
 1924 in fine arts of the Soviet Union

References

 
Years of the 20th century in art
1920s in art